Frank Woods may refer to:

 Frank E. Woods (1860–1939), screenwriter and one of the 36 founders of Academy of Motion Picture Arts and Sciences
 Frank P. Woods (1868–1944), member of the United States House of Representatives
 Frank Theodore Woods (1874–1932), English Anglican bishop, Bishop of Winchester
 Frank Woods (bishop) (1907–1992), English-born Anglican Archbishop of Melbourne, nephew of Theodore
 Frank Woods (pharmacologist) (1937–2016), British pharmacologist
 Frank Woods (cricketer) (1889–1951), New Zealand cricketer
 MSgt. Frank Woods, a non-playable character in Call of Duty: Black Ops, and a playable character in Call of Duty: Black Ops II

See also
Francis Woods (1819–1894), Canadian businessman and politician
Francis Charles Woods, American architect and organ builder
Frank Wood (disambiguation)